Perry Schwartz (April 27, 1915 – January 4, 2001) 
Son of Henry & Maude (nee Perry) Swartz, was a professional American football end. He played five seasons with the National Football League's Brooklyn Dodgers (1938–1942) and the All-America Football Conference's New York Yankees (1946). Schwartz was Jewish.

References

External links

 California Golden Bears bio
 

1915 births
2001 deaths
American football ends
Brooklyn Dodgers (NFL) players
California Golden Bears football players
New York Yankees (AAFC) players
Iowa Pre-Flight Seahawks football players
Sacramento City Panthers football players
Sportspeople from the San Francisco Bay Area
Tamalpais High School alumni
Players of American football from Chicago
People from Cloverdale, California
Players of American football from California